Camille Achille Desmarcheliers (13 August 1884 – 11 October 1914) was a French gymnast. He competed in the men's team event at the 1908 Summer Olympics. He was killed in action during World War I.

References

External links
 

1884 births
1914 deaths
French male artistic gymnasts
Olympic gymnasts of France
Gymnasts at the 1908 Summer Olympics